Believe in Me is a 1971 American romantic drama film directed by Stuart Hagmann and written by Israel Horovitz. The film was produced by Robert Chartoff and Irwin Winkler.

Plot

Cast
Michael Sarrazin as Remy
Jacqueline Bisset as Pamela
Jon Cypher as Alan
Allen Garfield as Stutter
Kurt Dodenhoff as Matthew
Kevin Conway as Clancy
Roger Robinson as Angel
Marcia Jean Kurtz as Emergency Room Nurse
Ultra Violet as Emergency Room Patient

Production
The film was originally called Speed is of the Essence and reunited the studio, director, producers and writer of The Strawberry Statement. Irwin Winkler wrote in his memoirs that MGM's then head of production James Aubrey was the one who cast Michael Sarrazin and Jacqueline Bisset, although the director and producer liked both actors. Winkler says Aubrey demanded reshoots be done by another director and the producers hired John Alviden to do another three weeks of filming; they would later work together on Rocky.

Reception
The magazine New Yorks Judith Crist disliked Hagmann's direction and Horovitz's screenwriting and wrote, "[It] is a sloppy story about an intern driven to drugs because he sees kids and old people get sick, and who apparently makes his girl an addict too—or simply makes her stop wearing eyeliner. You can't tell which—and couldn't care less.

Roger Greenspun of The New York Times wrote that Believe in Me avoided melodrama seen in other drug films but found that it had predictable surprises and failed to explain "crucial" questions. He reviewed, "[It] is full of plot hints dropped and never retrieved, and it seems to have been cut—not so much edited as maimed. When allowed some emotional range ... Stuart Hagmann directs a rather decent movie. But such moments are too few, and in suppressing even pathos, the film also suppresses the other feelings that could have made it live."

See also
 List of American films of 1971

References

External links

1971 films
1971 romantic drama films
Films about drugs
Films scored by Fred Karlin
Films set in New York City
Metro-Goldwyn-Mayer films
Films produced by Robert Chartoff
Films produced by Irwin Winkler
American romantic drama films
1970s English-language films
Films directed by Stuart Hagmann
1970s American films